Kis Kisko Pyaar Karoon is a 2015 Indian Hindi-language comedy film directed by Abbas Mustan. Stand-up comedian Kapil Sharma made his Bollywood debut with this movie, as did actress Sai Lokur and supporting actress Jamie Lever. Other cast members include Arbaaz Khan, Manjari Fadnis, Simran Kaur Mundi, Elli Avram, Varun Sharma, Supriya Pathak, Sharat Saxena, Manoj Joshi and Sharad Sankla. Kapil Sharma was to have previously appeared in Yash Raj's film Bank Chor, but he opted out of it. The music is composed by Tanishk Bagchi, Dr Zeus, Javed Mohsin and Amjad Nadim. The film garnered controversy over keeping names on Hindus gods. The film was served with legal notice citing similarities to a Kannada film, Nimbehuli produced by Subhash Ghai.

Plot 
This film starts with a voiceover of the explanation of marriage and how it has changed people's lives. Then, Kumar Shiv Ram Kishan's life is introduced. It has been shown how Kumar accidentally marries three different women – Juhi, Anjali and Simran – to prevent them from committing suicide. Without letting them know about each other, he makes excuses to spend one night with each wife. On the advice of his friend, Karan, he buys three flats on different floors of the same building for his wives, and Kumar and Karan experience unlikely situations as a result.

Kumar also has a girlfriend, Deepika, who he wants to marry, and Deepika's father accepts Kumar as his son-in-law. One evening before Karva Chauth, Deepika's father sees Kumar with his three wives, one at a time, but Kumar passes it off as an April Fool trick played by the women. Deepika's father again suspects Kumar when he sees Kumar's photo and believes him to be engaged to a female employee. Deepika and Kumar decide to marry in court to avoid tensions. However, another complication arises as Kumar's estranged parents reconcile, realize they each know their son to have a different wife, then learn he's to marry Deepika.

Karan and Deepika wait a long time at the courthouse; when Kumar does arrive, he sees his three wives – who have become good friends with Deepika – and has to hide. Karan tells Deepika and the wives that the groom went to the hospital to help a friend, and to postpone the wedding by two days. The wives leave and Kumar comes out saying it's okay and they can marry, stopping Deepika when she tries to call her friends. He suggests going to a temple to marry and sends Karan to bring what they will need.

Deepika's father brings Kumar and Deepika to his office and confronts his employee. The woman denies that Kumar is her fiancé, and Deepika's father realizes the photo had been left by his daughter. Deepika's father decides to fire his employee for making him doubt his future son-in-law, but Kumar saves her job and Deepika's father decides to celebrate the wedding.

Everyone arrives on the day of the wedding, all made to wear wedding clothes so that they can't recognize Kumar or each other. However, Anjali's brother Tiger Bhai is in search of a guy and makes everyone put down their pagri (turbans, with veils concealing their faces).  Kumar hesitates when it is his turn, but Tiger's men bring the guy and Kumar is spared.

The wedding ceremony continues. By chance, Kumar's face passes in front of a fire and he is exposed. Kumar explains that he didn't break the heart of his three wives – that they forcefully made him marry, without listening to him or asking if he was married, that he couldn't leave them to commit suicide, and confesses his deep regret at breaking the heart of his true love, Deepika. Everyone cries and Kumar's mother hugs him tightly while Deepika's father asks Deepika to make her choice.  In the end, all four wives are shown accepting each other, with only Tiger left in confusion.

Cast

 Kapil Sharma as Shivkumar "Bholu" Ramkrishna Punj alias Ram Kumar Punj/Shiv Kumar Punj/Kishan Kumar Punj/Kumar Punj 
 Varun Sharma as Advocate Karan Mehta, Kumar's friend
 Sai Lokur as Anjali Kishan Punj, Kumar's second wife, Tiger bhai's sister
 Elli Avram as Deepika "Deepu" Kothari / Deepika Kumar Punj, Kumar's girlfriend turned fourth wife
 Simran Kaur Mundi as Simran Shiv Punj, Kumar's third wife
 Manjari Fadnis as Juhi Ram Punj, Kumar's first wife
 Jamie Lever as Champa, Simran's house maid
 Arbaaz Khan as Tiger Bhai, Anjali's partially deaf brother
 Supriya Pathak as Rukmani Punj, Kumar's mother, Brijmohan's divorced wife
 Sharat Saxena as Brijmohan Punj, Kumar's father, Rukmani's divorced husband
 Kundan Pandey as Aryan
 Manoj Joshi as Gulabchand Kothari, Deepika's father
 Sunny Cheema as Anil
 Praveen K Bhatia as Guard
 Sharad Sankla as Charlie
 Nataliya Kozhenova as Lily

Production
The film began production in the first week of November 2014.  The film was produced by Ratan Jain, Ganesh Jain and Abbas–Mustan under their banner Venus Records & Tapes Pvt Ltd in association with Abbas Mustan Films Production Pvt Ltd.

Soundtrack

The background score is composed by Salil Amrute. The full audio album was released on 4 September 2015 by Zee Music Company. Most of the songs were choreographed by Ahmed Khan.

The soundtrack for Kis Kisko Pyaar Karoon was composed by Dr Zeus, Tanishk Bagchi, Javed–Mohsin and Amjad–Nadeem, with lyrics written by Shabbir Ahmed, Arafat Mehmood, Raj Ranjodh, Mavi Singh and Bhinda Bawakhe.

Critical reception

Bollywood Hungama gave the film three stars out of five, citing the film as a perfect vehicle for Sharma's transition from television, the directors' successful transition from action to comedy, and the screenplay and dialogues as "extremely engaging" while calling the music a letdown.

Rohit Bhatnagar of Deccan Chronicle wrote that Varun Sharma's portrayal of Karan was comical, but the screenplay was "dismal", the music was "ear piercing" and the dance numbers were "sleazy", with Kapil Sharma's dancing described as "stiff".

Martin D'Souza of Glamsham wrote, "it is Kapil's comic timing and assurance of turning a nondescript scene into something humongously hilarious is what tilts the scales in favour of this film.

Renuka Vyavahare of The Times of India gave the movie 2 out of 5 stars, saying, "The girls look pretty and the samandar song is beautiful but if you want to see the film solely for Kapil's brand of humour, you get babaji ka thullu."

Subhash K. Jha of SKJ Bollywood News gave the movie 3 out of 5 stars, saying, "Off and on Abbas Mustan's purported comedy will remind you of the Govinda comedies directed by David Dhawan and Anees Bazmi's Sandwich. To his credit Kapil carries off the lighter moments with elan."

Box office
The film collected  net on its opening day and became the highest first-day grosser for a newcomer, beating the previous record-holder, Student of the Year.

On its second day the film collected . The film collected  on its third day taking the first weekend total to  net.
On the fifth day the film collected .

The film grossed  in its second week to take its total to  after two weeks.

References

External links
 

2015 films
2010s Hindi-language films
2015 comedy films
Indian comedy films
Films about marriage
Films about polygamy
Films directed by Abbas–Mustan
Films scored by Amjad Nadeem
Films scored by Dr Zeus
Films scored by Tanishk Bagchi
Films scored by Javed–Mohsin